Mylothris dimidiata, the western sulphur dotted border, is a butterfly in the family Pieridae. It is found in Guinea, Sierra Leone, Liberia, Ivory Coast and western Ghana. The habitat consists of dense forests.

References

Seitz, A. Die Gross-Schmetterlinge der Erde 13: Die Afrikanischen Tagfalter. Plate XIII 12

Butterflies described in 1898
Pierini
Butterflies of Africa
Taxa named by Per Olof Christopher Aurivillius